The Building at 1119–1121 W. Third Street was historic building located in the West End of Davenport, Iowa, United States. It was built in 1875 and featured elements of the Chicago School of architecture. The building was a three-story brick structure with flat arched windows. The third floor windows were shorter than those of the other two floors. The only decoration on the façade was brick corbelling at the cornice level and keystones over the windows. It was listed on the National Register of Historic Places in 1983. This combination commercial and residential rental property had been owned by a series of owners over the years. It has since been demolished and the property turned into a parking lot.

References

External links

Commercial buildings completed in 1875
Commercial architecture in Iowa
Former buildings and structures in Davenport, Iowa
Commercial buildings on the National Register of Historic Places in Iowa
National Register of Historic Places in Davenport, Iowa
Demolished buildings and structures in Iowa
1875 establishments in Iowa
Chicago school architecture in Iowa